Leuchtenbergia is a genus of cactus which has only one species, Leuchtenbergia principis (agave cactus or prism cactus). It is native to north-central Mexico (San Luis Potosi, Chihuahua). The genus is named after Maximilian Eugen Joseph (1817–1852), Duke of Leuchtenberg and amateur botanist.

It is very slow-growing but can eventually grow up to 70 cm high, with a cylindrical stem which becomes bare and corky at the base with age. It has long, slender, grayish-green tubercles 6–12 cm long, with purplish-red blotches at their tips. The tubercles are topped with papery spines, making the plant resemble an agave; old, basal tubercles dry up and fall off. After four years or so, yellow, funnel-shaped flowers 5–6 cm diameter may be borne at the tubercle tips. The fruit is smooth and green, 3 cm long and 2 cm broad. It has a large, tuberous taproot.

Taxonomy
It is related to the genus Ferocactus, and hybrids have been created between these two genera.

References

Huxley, A., ed. (1992). New RHS Dictionary of Gardening. Macmillan.

Flora of Chihuahua (state)
Cactoideae
Monotypic Cactaceae genera